Sweedie Learns to Swim is a 1914 silent short 1-reel comedy film starring Wallace Beery and Ben Turpin and produced and distributed by the Essanay Company.

This short survives in the Library of Congress collection, UCLA Film and Television and others.

Cast
Wallace Beery as Sweedie
Betty Brown as Mrs. Rich
Ben Turpin as Captain of the Life Savers
Leo White as Mr. Rich
Charlotte Mineau

References

External links

1914 films
Essanay Studios films
American silent short films
Silent American comedy films
1914 comedy films
1914 short films
American black-and-white films
American comedy short films
1910s American films